Andrea Tiezzi Rojas (born 26 November 1964) is an Argentine former professional tennis player.

Biography
Tiezzi, a top-10 junior, played on the professional tour in the 1980s and early 1990s. 

At the 1987 Pan American Games in Indianapolis, Tiezzi won silver medals for Argentina in both the women's doubles and mixed doubles events.

She featured once in the singles main draw of a grand slam tournament, as a qualifier at the 1988 French Open. 

Her best performance on the WTA Tour was a quarter-final appearance at Guaruja in 1989.

ITF finals

Singles (1–5)

Doubles (2–11)

References

External links
 
 

1964 births
Living people
Argentine female tennis players
Pan American Games silver medalists for Argentina
Pan American Games medalists in tennis
Tennis players at the 1987 Pan American Games
Medalists at the 1987 Pan American Games
20th-century Argentine women